Abdulka is a rural locality (a settlement) in Tochilninskoye Rural Settlement of Ashinsky District, Chelyabinsk Oblast, Russia. The population was 12 as of 2010.

Geography 
Abdulka is located 9 km northwest of Asha (the district's administrative centre) by road. Krasny Yar is the nearest rural locality.

References 

Rural localities in Chelyabinsk Oblast